Emmanuelle Gagliardi and Dinara Safina were the defending champions, but none competed this year. Gagliardi competed in Kolkata at the same week, while Safina decided to rest after her participation in the Fed Cup final.

Nuria Llagostera Vives and María Vento-Kabchi won the title by defeating Yan Zi and Zheng Jie 6–2, 6–4 in the final.

Seeds

Draw

Draw

References
 Main and Qualifying Draw (WTA)

2005 WTA Tour
2005 China Open (tennis)